Saint Oduvald (died 698) was a Scottish nobleman, monk, and abbot of Melrose Abbey.
His feast day is 26 May.

Monks of Ramsgate account

The monks of St Augustine's Abbey, Ramsgate wrote in their Book of Saints (1921),

Butler's account

The hagiographer Alban Butler (1710–1773) wrote in his Lives of the Fathers, Martyrs, and Other Principal Saints under May 26,

Notes

Sources

 
 

Saints
698 deaths